Erhardt Jensen (30 October 1887 – 14 September 1944) was a Danish footballer. He played in one match for the Denmark national football team in 1918.

References

External links
 

1887 births
1944 deaths
Danish men's footballers
Denmark international footballers
Place of birth missing
Association footballers not categorized by position